Viveka Eriksson or Viveca Eriksson (born 18 August 1956) is a politician of Åland and the former Premier of Åland from 2007 to 2011.

Professional overview
Member of the Lagting (Åland parliament) 2011 –
Premier, Government of Åland October 2007 – November 2011
First Deputy Speaker of the Lagting (Ålands parliament) 2005–2007
Speaker of the Lagting (Åland parliament) 2001–2005
First Deputy Speaker 2000–2001
Member of the Lagting (Åland parliament) 1995–2007
Chairwoman of the Åland Liberals since 2003
Member of the Speaker's Conference of the Lagting 1999–2000, 
Vice-speaker 2000–01 and again from 2005. 
Chairperson of the Finance Committee 1999–2001
Chairperson of the Liberal Parliamentary Group 1999–2001 and Party Chairperson from 2004.

Eriksson was the first female Speaker in Åland history. As party leader of the Åland Liberals she won the 2007 election and was sworn in as the first female Premier.

See also
List of current heads of government of dependencies
List of speakers of the Parliament of Åland

Notes

References
Aland Islands parliament elects speakers
UCSD Abreast - Women Heads of State: 2007–Present Viveca Eriksson
Official website of the Government of Åland
Official website of the Parliament of Åland

Living people
1956 births
Premiers of Åland
Speakers of the Parliament of Åland
Members of the Parliament of Åland
Women government ministers of Åland
20th-century Finnish women politicians
21st-century Finnish women politicians